King's Highway 64, commonly referred to as Highway 64, is a provincially maintained highway in the Canadian province of Ontario, connecting Highway 69 north of the French River with Highway 11 at Marten River, via Highway 17 west of Sturgeon Falls. The route serves several communities along the north shore of the French River and west shore of Lake Nipissing as it travels from Highway 69 to Highway 17. North of Sturgeon Falls, the highway provides a shortcut between Highway 17 and Highway 11 northwest of North Bay.

Highway 64 was first assumed in 1937, the year that the Ontario Department of Highways (DHO) merged with the Department of Northern Development (DND) and began assigning route numbers in northern Ontario. It initially connected only Highway 17 and Highway 11, as Highway 69 was not completed through French River until after World War II. In 1956, the route was extended southwest to Rutter via Noëlville to meet Highway 69, establishing the route as it exists today.

Route description 
The southern terminus of Highway 64 is an interchange with Highway 69 in Sudbury District at Rutter. Formerly a grade-level intersection, this terminus was upgraded to a full interchange which officially opened in 2016, as part of the ongoing freeway conversion of Highway 69.
West of the interchange, the roadway continues as Daoust Lake Road.

At that intersection, Highway 528 continues east, while Highway 64 turns north for four kilometres to Noëlville, where it intersects with Highway 535. Highway 535 continues north, while Highway 64 heads east again for six kilometres to the community of Chartrand Corner.

Highway64 continues, alternating in northward and eastward segments around the west arm of Lake Nipissing, crossing into Nipissing District just north of Mashkinonje Provincial Park, and eventually intersecting with Highway 17 at Verner.

The Ministry of Transportation of Ontario routinely performs traffic analysis on provincial highways, generating an average vehicle count per day over the course of a year at various sections along the routes. In 2016, the busiest section of Highway 64 was between Highway 69 and Highway 607, carrying an average of 2,200vehicles per day. Likewise, the least busy section is at the opposite end of the highway, between Highway 539 and Highway 11, carrying an average of 810vehicles per day.

History 
The Sturgeon Falls Road was first assumed by the DHO as Highway 64 on August 25, 1937, shortly after the merger with the DND.
As Highway 69 did not exist between Parry Sound and Sudbury until the 1950s, there was no need for a second highway connection through the French River area.
However, on January 25, 1956 the highway was extended south through Nipissing District, followed on February 8, 1956 with an extension through Sudbury District to the now-completed Highway 69.
This brought Highway 64 to its current length. Since then, aside from paving and minor realignments, Highway 64 has remained unchanged apart from the conversion of its junction with Highway 69 from a regular intersection to a freeway interchange. As part of the ongoing expansion of Highway69 to a freeway, an interchange was constructed immediately south of the intersection between the two highways. It was completed on July15, 2016, and opened to traffic shortly thereafter.

Major intersections

References

External links 

Route of Highway 64 on Google Maps
Highway 64 pictures and information

064
064
064
Transport in Temagami